"Hard for the Next" is a song by American rappers Moneybagg Yo and Future. It was released through Interscope Records and N-Less on March 26, 2021, as the second single of Moneybagg Yo's fourth studio album, A Gangsta's Pain. It samples American singer-songwriter Ginuwine's single "Differences", which is produced by Troy Oliver and appears on his third studio album, The Life (2001). The two artists wrote the song alongside Ginuwine, Troy Oliver, Torey Montana, the latter of who produced it.

Background and composition
In an interview with Zane Lowe of Apple Music on March 26, 2021, the same day that the song was released, Moneybagg Yo described the making of the song. He and Future linked up in the studio and went through different unreleased songs, with "Hard for the Next" being one of them, originally titled "Patek". Additionally, he said that Future is one of his top five favorite artists. Lyrically, Moneybagg Yo is "spoiling his lover because she completes him" and Future "just wants her next boyfriend to know that he was richer than him".

Release and promotion
Moneybagg Yo announced the song and release date along with its cover art through social media on March 23, 2021.

Music video
The official music video was released alongside the song on March 26, 2021. It stars Moneybagg Yo, Future, and the former's girlfriend, Ari Fletcher.

Credits and personnel
Credits adapted from Tidal.

 Moneybagg Yo – vocals, songwriting
 Future – vocals, songwriting
 Ginuwine – songwriting
 Troy Oliver – songwriting
 Torey Montana – production, songwriting
 Ari Morris – mixing, studio personnel
 Skywalker OG – engineer, studio personnel

Charts

Certifications

References

2021 singles
2021 songs
Moneybagg Yo songs
Future (rapper) songs
Songs written by Future (rapper)
Songs written by Ginuwine
Songs written by Troy Oliver
Interscope Records singles